Porcupinefish are fish belonging to the family Diodontidae (order Tetraodontiformes), also commonly called blowfish and, sometimes, balloonfish and globefish. They are sometimes collectively called pufferfish, not to be confused with the morphologically similar and closely related Tetraodontidae, which are more commonly given this name.

Porcupinefish are medium- to large-sized fish, and are found in shallow temperate and tropical seas worldwide. A few species are found much further out from shore, wherein large schools of thousands of individuals can occur. They are generally slow-moving.

Porcupinefish have the ability to inflate their bodies by swallowing water or air, thereby becoming rounder. This increase in size (almost double vertically) reduces the range of potential predators to those with much bigger mouths. A second defense mechanism is provided by the sharp spines, which radiate outwards when the fish is inflated.

Some species are poisonous, having tetrodotoxin in their internal organs, such as the ovaries and liver. This neurotoxin is at least 1200 times more potent than cyanide. The poison is produced by several types of bacteria obtained from the fish's diet.  As a result of these three defenses, porcupinefish have few predators, although adults are sometimes preyed upon by sharks and orcas.  Juveniles are also preyed on by Lysiosquillina maculata, tuna, and dolphins.

Porcupinefish are eaten as food fish and are an exotic delicacy in Cebu, Philippines, where they are called tagotongan. However, puffer fish can be a dangerous thing to eat since they can cause "Tetrodotoxin poisoning" which causes paralysis to certain parts of the body. Normally, this will only affect a person's health but in some cases it has lead to death since there is no known antidote for this type of poisoning. This however, doesn't stop people from consuming it. In fact, the risk factor is alluring to tourists, so in certain places such as Hawaii and Tahiti, it is sold in a dried up form.

History
The porcupine fish (as Diodon antennatus) is mentioned in Charles Darwin's famous account of his trip around the world, The Voyage of the Beagle. He noted how the fish can swim quite well when inflated,  though the altered buoyancy requires them to do so upside down. Darwin also mentioned hearing that a fellow naturalist, Dr. Allen of Forres, had  "frequently found a Diodon, floating alive and distended, in the stomach of the shark; and that on several occasions he has known it eat its way, not only through the coats of the stomach, but through the sides of the monster".

Gallery

In popular culture
A Pufferfish named Mrs. Puff, voiced by Mary Jo Catlett, appears in the Nickelodeon animated television series Spongebob Squarepants as the title character's boating (driving) instructor. 

A Pufferfish named Bloat, voiced by Brad Garrett, appears in the 2003 Disney-Pixar animated film Finding Nemo and its 2016 sequel Finding Dory.

In the Animal Crossing series, a pufferfish can be caught ingame. In Animal Crossing: New Horizons, the pufferfish model resembles a Diodon Holocanthus.

See also
List of fish families
List of freshwater aquarium fish species

References

External links

Diodontidae
Taxa named by Charles Lucien Bonaparte